David Dominick DeLuise (born November 11, 1971) is an American actor and television director. He has appeared on numerous television shows as well as films. He is known for Coop in the animated show Megas XLR and Jerry Russo in Wizards of Waverly Place.

Career
His first leading role came in 2003 with Dantre Cole, in BachelorMan. He had a recurring role in 3rd Rock from the Sun as Bug Pollone and was a regular performer on Jesse during its first season, playing Jesse's brother Darren. He also played a recurring role in Stargate SG-1 as Pete Shanahan. He was also seen in a Purina commercial for Beneful dog food, and a Kentucky Fried Chicken commercial. He also had special appearances in Gilmore Girls season 4 episodes 20 and 22 as TJ's brother.

DeLuise is also known for voicing Coop on the short-lived action animated Megas XLR (later reprising his role for the Cartoon Network game FusionFall) and Sergeant Brutto in Roughnecks: Starship Troopers Chronicles. In 2005, he starred opposite Maggie Wheeler on the NBC pilot The Sperm Donor. In 2012, he had a guest role on Rizzoli & Isles as Dominic.

He portrayed the character of Jerry Russo, the family patriarch and former wizard on Disney Channel's Wizards of Waverly Place and Wizards of Waverly Place: The Movie from 2007 to 2012. DeLuise also directed numerous episodes of the series, beginning with the episode "My Tutor, Tutor" (2009). He has since directed episodes of How to Rock, See Dad Run, Lab Rats, and The Thundermans.

In August 2012 he appeared in a commercial for KFC's Original Recipe Bites.

In February 2023 he started the podcast Wizards of Waverly Pod with Jennifer Stone, where both talk about their experience on the show Wizards of Waverly Place.

Filmography

Film

Television

Video games

References

External links

1971 births
Living people
American male film actors
American people of Italian descent
American male television actors
American television directors
American male voice actors
Male actors from Burbank, California
20th-century American male actors
21st-century American male actors
DeLuise family